Enrique Antonio Lantigua (June 15, 1910 – June 29, 1985), nicknamed El Mariscal, was a Dominican catcher who played in the Negro leagues in the 1930s.

A native of Santiago, Dominican Republic, Lantigua played for the New York Cubans in 1935. In six recorded games, he went hitless in 14 plate appearances. Lantigua died in Santo Domingo, Dominican Republic in 1985 at age 75.

References

External links
 and Seamheads

1910 births
1985 deaths
New York Cubans players
Dominican Republic baseball players
Baseball catchers
People from Santiago de los Caballeros